The FIS Nordic Junior and U23 World Ski Championships 2012 took place in Erzurum, Turkey from 19 February to 26 February 2012. It was the 35th Junior World Championships and the 7th Under-23 World Championships in nordic skiing.

Medal summary

Junior events

Cross-country skiing

Nordic Combined

Ski jumping

Under-23 events

Cross-country skiing

Medal table

References 

2012
2012 in cross-country skiing
2012 in ski jumping
Junior World Ski Championships
2012 in youth sport
International sports competitions hosted by Turkey